Konzo is an epidemic paralytic disease occurring among hunger-stricken rural populations in Africa where a diet dominated by insufficiently processed cassava results in simultaneous malnutrition and high dietary cyanide intake. Konzo was first described by Giovanni Trolli in 1938 who compiled the observations from eight doctors working in the Kwango area of the Belgian Congo (now Democratic Republic of the Congo).

Signs and symptoms

The onset of paralysis (spastic paraparesis) is sudden and symmetrical and affects the legs more than the arms. The resulting disability is permanent but does not progress. Typically, a patient is standing and walking on the balls of the feet with rigid legs and often with ankle clonus.

Initially, most patients experience generalized weakness during the first days and are bedridden for some days or weeks before trying to walk. Occasional blurred vision and/or speech difficulties typically clear during the first month, except in severely affected patients. Spasticity is present from the first day, without any initial phase of flaccidity. After the initial weeks of functional improvement, the spastic paraparesis remains stable for the rest of life. Some patients may experience an abrupt aggravating episode, e.g. a sudden and permanent worsening of the spastic paraparesis. Such episodes are identical to the initial onset and can therefore be interpreted as a second onset.

The severity of konzo varies; cases range from only hyperreflexia in the lower limbs to a severely disabled patient with spastic paraparesis, associated weakness of the trunk and arms, impaired eye movements, speech and possibly visual impairment. Although the severity varies from patient to patient, the longest upper motor neurons are invariably more affected than the shorter ones. Thus, a konzo patient with speech impairment always shows severe symptoms in the legs and arms.

Recently, neuropsychological effects of konzo have been described from DR Congo.

Cause

The character of the neurological injury is not clear. The disease onset is associated with high intake of cyanide from a diet of mostly bitter cassava, which is low in protein, particularly sulfur amino acids. These are essential for the detoxification in the body of cyanide to thiocyanate, which is removed in the urine. A number of studies implicate the combination of high cyanide intake from bitter cassava and low intake of sulfur amino acids as the cause. It has now been shown that the month by month incidence of konzo is significantly correlated with the percentage of children with high urinary thiocyanate content, which is a measure of their cyanide intake.  The importance of an adequate supply of protein sulfur amino acids is shown from three unrelated konzo epidemics in Mozambique,  Tanzania and DRC. People of the same ethnic group living only 5 km away from those with konzo had near zero konzo prevalence, because in Mozambique they lived near the sea, in Tanzania they lived near Lake Victoria and had access to fish and in DRC they lived near the forest and had access to animal protein.

The dose–response relationship between konzo incidence and cyanide intake, together with the prevention of konzo in many villages by reducing cyanide intake from cassava (see below) and the importance of sulfur amino acids in prevention of konzo, shows that konzo is very likely due to high cyanide/low sulfur amino acid intake in a diet of bitter cassava. Konzo does not occur unless these conditions are met, which occurs only in remote villages in six tropical African countries. The total number of reported cases up to 2009 was 6788, but most cases are never reported and there was an estimate of 100,000 cases in DRC alone in 2002. Konzo is spreading geographically as cassava is being grown in new areas where there is little knowledge of processing methods to remove cyanogens.  Konzo epidemics occur due to war which causes disruption of life in poor villages and drought, when the plant increases the cyanogen content of roots 2–4 times and the cyanide content of cassava flour also increases greatly. Konzo is also endemic in certain areas.

Traditional methods of processing cassava to remove cyanogens consist of sun drying and heap fermentation in East Africa, which are inadequate in removal of cyanogens even in a year of normal rainfall. In Central Africa soaking (retting) of cassava roots in water for 4–5 days is adequate, but short soaking for 1–2 days leaves large amounts of cyanogens in flour and leads to konzo. In West Africa a roasted product called garri is produced by a different method than that used to produce flour, which reduces the total cyanide content to 10–20 ppm. There are no reported cases of konzo west of Cameroon. However another neurological disease called tropical ataxic neuropathy (TAN), occurs amongst older people in West Africa (including south-west Nigeria, and also Tanzania, Uganda, Kenya, West Indies and South India) and is probably due to long term intake of cyanogens from cassava at a lower level than that needed to cause konzo.

Diagnosis

The WHO has recommended three criteria for the diagnosis of konzo:
 a visible symmetric spastic abnormality of gait while walking or running;
 a history of onset of less than one week followed by a non-progressive course in a formerly healthy person;
 bilaterally exaggerated knee or ankle jerk reflexes without signs of disease of the spine.

Depending on its severity, konzo is divided into three categories: mild when individuals are able to walk without support, moderate when individuals need one or two sticks to walk, and severe when the affected person is unable to walk unsupported.

Differential diagnosis

The clinical symptoms are strikingly similar to those of lathyrism and also similar to tropical spastic paraparesis and hereditary spastic paraparesis, only that the latter two disorders have a slow onset. Konzo is distinct from polio which is a flaccid paralysis and most often affects a person asymmetrically.

Konzo is one of several tropical neuropathies. A distinct myeloneuropathy also associated to cyanogen intake from cassava is tropical ataxic neuropathy (TAN), as first described in parts of Nigeria by B. O. Osuntokun in 1968. The disease is still occurring in the same areas.

Prevention

Konzo can be prevented by use of the "wetting method," which is used to remove residual cyanogens from cassava flour, as an additional processing method. Cassava flour is placed in a bowl and the level marked on the inside of the bowl. Water is added with mixing until the height of the wet flour comes up to the mark. The wet flour is placed in a thin layer on a mat for 2 hours in the sun or 5 hours in the shade to allow the escape of hydrogen cyanide produced by the breakdown of linamarin by the enzyme linamarase. The damp flour is then cooked in boiling water in the traditional way to produce a thick porridge called "fufu" or "ugali", which is flavoured by some means such as a sauce. The wetting method is accepted by rural women because it requires little extra work or equipment and produces fufu which is not bitter, because the bitter tasting linamarin has gone.

In 2010 the wetting method was taught to the women in Kay Kalenge village, Popokabaka Health Zone, Bandundu Province, DRC, where there were 34 konzo cases. The women used the method and during the intervention there were no new konzo cases and the urinary thiocyanate content of the school children fell to safe levels. Konzo had been prevented for the first time ever in the same health zone in which it had first been discovered by Dr Trolli in 1938. Fourteen months after the intervention ceased the village was visited again. It was found that there were no new cases of konzo, the school children had low urinary thiocyanate levels, the wetting method was still being used and it had spread by word of mouth to three nearby villages. It is important to teach the women that konzo is due to a poison present in their food, to get them to regularly use the wetting method and posters are available in 13 different languages as a teaching aid as an additional method to remove residual cyanogens.

The wetting method has now been used in 13 villages in the DRC with a collective population of nearly 10,000 people. The time of the intervention has been reduced from 18 months in the first intervention, to 12 months in the second intervention, to 9 months in the third and fourth interventions. This has reduced the cost per person of the intervention to prevent konzo by removing cyanogens from cassava flour, to $16 per person. This targeted method to reduce cyanide intake is much cheaper and more effective in preventing konzo than broad based interventions.

Prognosis

Although no treatment has been found it has been shown that affected individuals benefit considerably from rehabilitation and use of adequate walking aids. In the Central African Republic some children have been operated with an elongation of the Achilles tendon which improved the position of the foot but the long term consequence remains uncertain.

Epidemiology
Konzo has been reported in outbreaks mainly among women and children in remote rural populations in DR Congo, Mozambique (where it is known as mantakassa), Tanzania, Central African Republic, Cameroon and Angola.

The first reported outbreak occurred in Bandundu Province in present-day DR Congo in 1936–1937 and the second in Nampula Province of Northern Mozambique in 1981. Each of these outbreaks numbered more than 1000 cases. Familial clustering is common. Outbreaks typically occur in the dry season in households living in absolute poverty that have sustained themselves for weeks or months on insufficiently processed bitter cassava. Both smaller outbreaks and sporadic cases have been reported from all the countries above.

Etymology

"Konzo" means "tied legs" in the Yaka language in Southwestern DR Congo and was the designation by the first affected population in DR Congo as reported by Dr G. Trolli in 1938. The name, taken up by Hans Rosling and colleagues, aptly describes the typical spastic gait of those affected.

References

External links 

 

Foodborne illnesses
Neurological disorders
Cerebral palsy and other paralytic syndromes